"Never Seen the Rain" is a song by Australian singer Tones and I, released in Australia on 16 July 2019 as the third single (second in the US) from Tones and I's debut EP The Kids Are Coming. Upon release Tones and I said "[It's] about people who live the same repetitive life in fear of failure. So, they never try." 
In January 2020, the single was released outside of Australia. In February, it achieved gold status in New Zealand. At the end of August 2020 it was certified 5× platinum by ARIA for shipment of 350,000 copies.

The song won Most Performed Australian Work and Most Performed Pop Work at the APRA Music Awards of 2021.

Critical reception
Al Newstead from ABC said "'Never Seen the Rain' retains her keen pop sensibilities but wraps those distinctive vocals into an uplifting chorus."

Music video
The music video was produced by Visible Studios, directed by Nick Kozakis and Liam Kelly, and released on 7 August 2019.

Personnel
Credits adapted from AllMusic.

 Toni Watson – composer
 Konstantin Kersting – mixing, production
 Andrei Eremin – mastering

Charts

Weekly charts

Year-end charts

Certifications

Release history

References

2019 singles
2019 songs
Tones and I songs
APRA Award winners
Song recordings produced by Konstantin Kersting
Songs written by Tones and I